David Adam Wilkinson, FRAS (born 16 May 1963) is a British Methodist minister, theologian, astrophysicist and academic. He is the current Principal of St John's College, Durham, and a professor in the Department of Theology and Religion at Durham University. He is the author of several books on the relationship between science and religion, and a regular contributor to Thought for the Day on BBC Radio 4. He has a PhD in astrophysics and is a Fellow of the Royal Astronomical Society.

Early life and education
Wilkinson was born on 16 May 1963. An undergraduate at Grey College, Durham, he studied at the University of Durham, graduating with a Bachelor of Science (BSc) degree in 1984. He remained at Durham to undertake a Doctor of Philosophy (PhD) degree in theoretical astrophysics. His PhD was awarded in 1987: his doctoral thesis was titled "Molecular hydrogen in galaxies" and related to the study of star formation.

After completing his science doctorate, Wilkinson changed direction. He studied theology at Fitzwilliam College, Cambridge alongside his training as a Methodist minister at Wesley House, Cambridge. He graduated from the University of Cambridge with a Bachelor of Arts (BA) degree in 1989: as per tradition, his BA was promoted to a Master of Arts (MA Cantab) degree. He would later study for a PhD in systematic theology at the University of Durham, which he completed in 2004 with a doctoral thesis titled "Christian eschatology and the physical universe".

Career
After ordination, he was a Methodist minister in Letchworth from 1990 to 1991. He then took on two posts: as minister of Elm Hall Drive Methodist Church in Liverpool and a chaplain at the University of Liverpool. In 1999, he moved to Durham where he had been appointed a fellow in Christian apologetics at St John's College, Durham. Then, from 2004 to 2006, he was Wesley Research Lecturer in Theology and Science in the University of Durham's Department of Theology and Religion. In December 2005, it was announced that he would be returning to St John's College, having been appointed its next principal in succession to Professor Stephen Sykes. He had to be given permission by the Methodist Church for the appointment due to the college's Anglican foundation: St John's college is both a college of Durham University and an evangelical Anglican theological college. He took up the post in 2006. He was additionally made a professor in the Department of Theology and Religion in 2011.

Wilkinson's academic interests focus on the interaction between theology and science. He has also published on Stephen Hawking, spirituality in contemporary cinema and the doctrine of holiness. He has been a council member of the Evangelical Alliance.

Personal life
In 1992, Wilkinson married Alison. She is also a Methodist minister. Together they have one son and one daughter.

Selected bibliography

Books

Articles

References

External links 
 Profile: Revd Professor David Wilkinson Durham University

1963 births
Academics of Durham University
Alumni of Fitzwilliam College, Cambridge
Living people
English Methodist ministers
20th-century Methodist ministers
21st-century Methodist ministers
British astrophysicists
Fellows of the Royal Astronomical Society
Principals of St John's College, Durham
British evangelicals